Dowlatabad (also Romanized as Dowlatābād) is a village in Musaabad Rural District, in the Central District of Dehaqan County, Isfahan Province, Iran. At the 2006 census, its population was 909, in 217 families.

References 

Populated places in Dehaqan County